was a Japanese painter and artist in the Muromachi period in the service of the Ashikaga shōguns. Born into a family of renowned artists and curators (Ami family), he succeeded his father Shinno (Nōami) as the curator of the Ashikaga art collection and became a painter in his own right.  He is known for his yamato-e paintings in Sumi-e style, following the tradition of Tenshō Shūbun. Geiami and his son Sōami were known as the three-Ami's or San-Ami when with their ancestor.

References

1431 births
1485 deaths
Japanese painters